Tong is a civil parish in Shropshire, England.  It contains 48 listed buildings that are recorded in the National Heritage List for England.  Of these, one is listed at Grade I, the highest of the three grades, two are at Grade II*, the middle grade, and the others are at Grade II, the lowest grade.  The parish includes the village of Tong, and is otherwise rural.  The M54 motorway passes through the parish, going through the site of Tong Castle, of which there are few remains on each side of the motorway, and which are listed.  The most important building in the parish is the 13th-century St Bartholomew's Church, which is listed at Grade I; items in the churchyard are also listed.  Most of the parish, including the village, is to the north of the motorway, and most of the listed buildings are houses, cottages, farmhouses, and farm buildings, the earliest of which are timber framed.  South of the motorway is Ruckley Grange, a country house designed by Ernest George and Yeates in 1904.  This, together with a number of associated structures, is listed.  The other listed buildings include two milestones and a boundary marker.


Key

Buildings

References

Citations

Sources

Lists of buildings and structures in Shropshire